Adama Koné (born 4 April 1987) is an Ivory Coast professional footballer who plays as a forward for Yangon United F.C. in the Myanmar National League. Before coming to Myanmar, he spent time in clubs in Israel, Egypt, and Thailand.

Career

Early career

Aged 12, Koné began his career in a football academy in Ivory Coast. After graduating, he departed to ply his trade overseas.

Yangon United

At the start of 2013, the Ivorian arrived in Myanmar to play because he viewed playing in Thailand as monotonous.

Koné made his debut in the AFC Cup with Burmese side Yangon United F.C. on 26 February 2013 against Indonesian Premier League side Persibo Bojonegoro in which he started and scored all three goals for his side in the 56th, 63rd, and 92nd minutes as Yangon United won 3–0. He then scored his fourth goal in two games in the very next match against Hong Kong First Division side Sun Hei SC in which he found the net in the 2nd minute as Yangon United won 3–1. He then continued his form in the AFC Cup on 3 April 2013 against Maldivian side New Radiant SC in which he scored in the 17th minute to lead Yangon United to a 2–0 victory. He then made it 4 for 4 when he scored yet again in Yangon United's 3–1 return loss to New Radiant on 9 April 2013.

Koné then scored in his fifth consecutive match in the AFC Cup on 24 April 2013 against Persibo in which he scored a brace in the 28th and 85th minutes of the match as Yangon United defeated Persibo 7–1. The Ivorian credited the success to his teammates, who set him up for scoring opportunities.

Honours

Clubs
Samutsakhon fc
Thai division 2 league 2015
Nakhonnayok fc 
Thai division 2 league 2014
Yangon United	
Myanmar National League (1): 2013
Yadanarbon fc 
Myanmar national league 2012
Phuket fc 
Thai division 1 league 2011
Sisaket fc 
Thai premier league 2010
Ttm phichit 
Thai premiere ligue 2010
Muangthong united 
Thai premiere league 2009

References

External links 
 

1987 births
Living people
Association football forwards
Ivorian footballers
People from Vallée du Bandama District
Yadanarbon F.C. players
Yangon United F.C. players
Myanmar National League players
Expatriate footballers in Myanmar
Ivorian expatriate footballers
Expatriate footballers in Egypt
Expatriate footballers in Thailand
Expatriate footballers in Israel
Ivorian expatriate sportspeople in Thailand
Ivorian expatriate sportspeople in Myanmar
Ivorian expatriate sportspeople in Israel
Ivorian expatriate sportspeople in Egypt